Siddhant Banthia (born 4 August 2000) is an Indian tennis player.

Banthia has a career high ATP singles ranking of 1125 achieved on 23 August 2021. He also has a career high ATP doubles ranking of 591 achieved on 27 May 2019.

Banthia made his ATP main draw debut at the 2021 Winston-Salem Open after receiving a wildcard into the doubles main draw.

Banthia plays college tennis at Wake Forest University.

References

External links

2000 births
Living people
Indian male tennis players
Sportspeople from Pune
Wake Forest Demon Deacons men's tennis players